Stengel & Co was a Dresden-based German printing company, that in the first decade of the 20th century became the largest postcard manufacturer in the world.

Stengel & Markert was founded in 1885 by Emil Stengel and Heinrich Markert after they bought the collotype printer, Scherer & Engler. In about 1889, Markert left to start his own printing business, and the company became Stengel & Co.

References

External links

Postcard publishers